Universidad del Sagrado Corazón (English: University of the Sacred Heart), abbreviated "USC" and often called simply Sagrado, is a private Catholic university in Santurce, San Juan, Puerto Rico. It is one of the oldest and largest educational institutions in Puerto Rico with origins dating back to the 1880 establishment of an elementary school by the Society of the Sacred Heart.

The university is situated in an area which was urbanized in the first decades of the twentieth century with great residences that belonged to the privileged families of the time and is rich in architectural styles. Renowned architect Antonín Nechodoma located his residence in Monteflores and some residences designed by him are still in the area. Including buildings with the unique French-style neoclassic architectural characteristics of the residence of Pablo Ubarri, Count of Santurce, which is now the center of the university's main campus. Such buildings abound along with Puerto Rican adaptations of Victorian architecture. There are also homes in the "tropical" U.S influenced Mission Revival, French-gothic, Spanish Colonial Revival, Prairie School, and several apartment structures of the "Art Deco" periods in Bouret street.

History 

It was the year 1880 when three nuns of the Society of the Sacred Heart of Jesus landed on the docks of San Juan, coming from Havana, Cuba.  Their mission was to establish in Puerto Rico the educational and spiritual work that just 80 years before Mother Madeleine Sophie Barat had begun in France.

At the beginning of the 20th century the institution acquired the Count of Santurce Estate and established the foundations of what makes-up today's campus.

In 1935, the local government issued the Letter Foundation, whereby it established the College of the Sacred Heart. Four years later, in 1939, the institution granted its first academic degrees. The original founding purpose was as an educational center for women in Puerto Rico to achieve ample knowledge, not only for their personal enrichment, but for the benefit of the territory.

In 1970, the religious order opted to transfer ownership and governance of the institution to the Board of Trustees (composed of some religious, but mostly lay members). This transition allowed for the notable expansion of academic offerings and student body.

In February 1972, a change in the institution's original vision took place. The Board of Trustees approved the establishment of an entirely co-ed institution. In December 1976, the Board of Trustees authorized the use of the new official name: "Universidad del Sagrado Corazon" (USC) or University of the Sacred Heart (USH). In 1985, the university established the first three graduate programs in: Education, Communications, and Business Administration.

In October 1984, Pope John Paul II held a mass at the university during the first and only Papal visit to Puerto Rico.In 1990, the university began to limit the number of undergraduate students accepted, in order to raise academic standards.

In January 2019, the division of continuing education was rebranded Sagrado Global, the School of Professional Studies at Sagrado, and started offering professional certificates in Digital marketing, Data Analytics, and Graphic Design, among others.  These professional certificates, some of which are also offered remotely, require taking 6 courses and can be completed in 1 year or less.

In 2019, the university had its first School of Music graduates with seven obtaining a Bachelor of Arts in music.
In 2019, Socorro Juliá- one of the oldest faces of the university was interviewed by El Vocero. She stated that she has been affiliated with the university since she was 5 years old, long before her religious calling.

In 2019, the university joined forced with the Santurce Cultural Center in an initiative to help business owners by offering free business  workshops and help local business explore ways to grow their business.

Campus 

panoramic views of the ocean and surrounding urban areas. In its abundant vegetation, highlighting forest of tropical plants that contribute to the freshness and beauty of the land University.

For the development of its activities, the university has the following facilities: the broad main building architecture classical, lifted at the beginning of the twentieth century, which today accommodates the administrative offices and in whose center is home to the Chapel of the Institution, which was listed in the National Register of Historic Places in 1983, the residence of the Religious of the Sacred Heart, the Information and Resource Center Modern facilities of the library. Then followed the student Residences, modern style, and south of the earlier, a complex structure consisting of classrooms, administrative and faculty offices, and an amphitheater.

The Mother Maria Teresa Guevara Library, one of the vital units of the university for his significant educational role, offers services to teachers, students, administrators and other members of the university community.

The Emilio S. Belaval Theater serves the development of a comprehensive program of artistic, cultural and academic development. A modern student center and sports complex to accommodate several service offices and fitness facilities, indoor stadium, tennis court, Olympic pool, meeting rooms and cafeteria.

Among the major academic resources at the disposal of the university, can be singled out the library, laboratories, Communication and technology education, science laboratories, languages, nursing and television studios and recordings.

Courses and certificates for working professionals are offered through Sagrado Global, the School of Professional Studies at Sagrado.   With close to 4,000 annual participants, the primary disciplines taught at Sagrado Global include Data Science & Analytics, Digital Marketing, Graphic Design, Entrepreneurship, Languages, Technology, Web Design, among others.

Accreditation and affiliations 

The University of the Sacred Heart is accredited by the following regional institutions:

 Council of Higher Education of Puerto Rico
 Council on Social Work Education (Social Work Program)
 Middle States Association of Colleges and Schools
 National Accrediting Agency for Clinical Laboratory Sciences (Program Medical Technology)
 National League for Nursing (Nursing Program)

The school is affiliated with the following organizations:

 Alliance Française
 American Library Association
 American Association of Collegiate Registrars and Admissions Officers
 American Association for Higher Education
 American Medical Association
 American Association of University Administration
 Association for Educational Communications and Technology
 Association of Private Colleges and Universities
 Manufacturers' Association of Puerto Rico
 Association of University Presidents of Puerto Rico
 Association of Universities and Research Institutes in the Caribbean
 Association of American Colleges
 Association of Catholic Colleges and Universities
 Association of Colleges and Universities Auditors
 Association of Governing Boards of Universities and Colleges
 Chamber of Commerce of Puerto Rico
 College Entrance Examination Board
 Council of International Education
 International Federation of Catholic Universities
 Hispanic Association of Colleges and Universities
 International Association for Continuing Education and Training (IACET)
 Institute of Internal Auditors
 Middle States Association of Colleges and Schools
 National Association of Colleges and University Business Officers
 National Association of Colleges and Universities
 National Association of Independent Colleges and Universities
 National Association of Student Financial Aid
 National Student Exchange.

Presidents and rectors 
 1951: Madre Dolores Sarre, RSCJ
 1951 - 1954: Madre Consuelo Herrera
 1954 - 1955: Madre Raquel Pérez
 1955 - 1967: Madre Rosa Aurora Arsuaga
 1968 - 1969: Madre Eleanor O'Byrne
 1969 - 1970: Madre María Milagros Carbonell
 1970 - 1972: Rafael García Bottari
 1972 - 1986: Pedro González Ramos
 1986 - 1992: José Alberto Morales
 1992 - 2014: José Jaime Rivera
 2014–Present: Gilberto Marxuach Torrós

Notable alumni 
 Raymond Arrieta - actor, comedian, musician and host
 María Elena Batista - 1988 Olympic swimmer, longest-serving Director of Sports in San Juan, USC Athletic Director
 Giannina Braschi, author of "United States of Banana", "Yo-Yo Boing!"and "Empire of Dreams"
 Sila Calderón - Puerto Rico's ex-governor
 Norma Candal - actress and comedian
 Doreen Colondres - chef, food writer, television presenter and sommelier.
 Dreuxilla Divine - drag queen, female impersonator, TV personality, actress.
 Carmen Dominicci -  news anchor and television reporter
 Juan Eugenio Hernández Mayoral - former senator
 Adamari López - actress and television host
 Nery Santos Gómez - author
 Teresa López  - artist and graphic designer 
 Melanie Maher - singer, actress and model
 Héctor Martínez - former Senator
 Lila Mayoral Wirshing - First Lady of Puerto Rico (1972–1977, 1985–1993)
 Karla Monroig - actress, model and television host
 Viviana Ortiz - Miss Universe Puerto Rico 2011
 Gilluis Pérez - actor
 Ivette Perfecto - ecologist
 Laura Ramirez - Miss America Puerto Rico 2012
 Kimmey Raschke - journalist, politician 
 Vilma Reyes (born 1958) - poet, storyteller and educator
 Birmania Rios - television journalist
 Rocky the Kid - Puerto Rican radio and television personality and actor
 Yara Sofia - female impersonator and reality television personality
 Luz María Umpierre - poet, scholar and human rights activist

References

External links 

 Official website 
 Sports at Sagrado 

Sacred Heart universities and colleges
Universities and colleges in Puerto Rico
Liga Atletica Interuniversitaria de Puerto Rico
1935 establishments in Puerto Rico